James P. Garrett (January 5, 1922 – October 16, 2015), usually known as "Jim" or "Judge", was the third child born to Wilkins B. Garrett and Willie M. Latimer Garrett in Mangum, Oklahoma. Raised in Mangum, he graduated from Mangum High School and the Oklahoma University (OU) School of Business. He enlisted in the U.S. Navy during World War II, was promoted to lieutenant, and saw action during the invasion of Normandy. After returning from the war, He enrolled in the Oklahoma University Law School, where he earned the Juris Doctor (J. D. degree). Thereafter, his career seemed connected with some form of law enforcement,

Career
Jim started his career practicing law in Mangum. The family has long had roots in Mangum's law enforcement history. Jim's grandfather, Seaborn B. Garrett, practiced law there when Mangum was part of "Old Greer County", in the Texas Panhandle, years before Oklahoma became a state. Wilkins B. was the District Judge for Greer County, Oklahoma after statehood.

During the 1960s, Garrett was on the Oklahoma Pardon & Parole Board. He was Assistant District Attorney for Carter County, Oklahoma, Assistant State Attorney General, working under Mac Q. Williamson, and District Attorney General for Southwestern Oklahoma. In 1987, he was appointed judge on the Oklahoma Court of Civil Appeals, where he remained until his retirement on December 31, 2001.

Family
Judge Garrett was the last of three children, and became the patriarch of a rather large extended family. It started with his late wife, Nedra (nee Wilson), with whom he had three children, son Stephen (better known as Steve and who is now deceased), daughters Linda Garrett Ellason (married to Lee Ellason) and Susan Garrett Christian (and spouse Leon Christian), and Steve Garrett's widow, Linda Garrett. Then there are nine grandchildren, sixteen great grandchildren and one great, great grandchild.

Activities
Life was not all about "crime and punishment" for Jim and Nedra. They both loved to go dancing, and the judge was especially proud of his talent at doing the jitterbug. Both were said to be master bridge players. He was also noted for his love of gardening and producing peanut brittle for the winter holidays.

Organization memberships
The judge belonged to both First Baptist Church in Mangum, where he also served as Deacon, and a member of Village Baptist Church in Oklahoma City.

He also belonged to:
 Oklahoma Toastmasters Club
 Rotary International
 Kiwanis International
 BPOE
 32nd Degree Mason, 33rd Degree Scottish Rite, and a Shriner
 Democratic Party of Oklahoma (He represented the State of Oklahoma at a Democratic National Convention.)

Death
Judge Garrett died October 16, 2015 in Oklahoma City. A memorial service was held October 23, 2015 at St. John's Episcopal Church in Oklahoma City. Interment was in Mangum.

See also
 Oklahoma Court of Civil Appeals

References

1922 births
2015 deaths
University of Oklahoma College of Law alumni
People from Mangum, Oklahoma
People from Oklahoma City
Oklahoma state court judges
20th-century American judges